The Apertura 2007 saw much success for the smaller teams in Argentine football. The eventual champions Lanús won the title for the first time in their history, the first maiden champions since Argentinos Juniors in 1984.

Second place went to Tigre, a club playing their first season in the Argentine Primera since 1980 and making their best finish ever in the top flight.

Third place went to Banfield, completing an extremely unlikely top three.

Another small club, Arsenal won the 2007 Copa Sudamericana, the first major title in their history, making them the first Argentine club other than Boca Juniors to win an international competition since San Lorenzo won the Copa Sudamericana 2002.

Another feature of the Apertura was the number of managerial changes, by the end of the Apertura there had been 12 managerial changes.

The Clausura 2008 was won by River Plate, their first title since 2004.

For the first time the 380 games of the season were broadcast live on television.

Club locations

Torneo Apertura

Standings

Top scorers

Torneo Clausura
Table positions as of June 22, 2008.

Standings

Top scorers
Positions as of June 25, 2008

Relegation

Promotion playoff 
Teams and schedules will be decided based on average after the end of the Closing tournament.
The first and second legs of the final are scheduled to be played on June 25 and June 29, respectively.

Gimnasia (Jujuy) wins 2-1 and stays in the Argentine First Division, while Unión de Santa Fe does not get promoted and remains in Argentine Nacional B.

 Racing wins 2-1 and stays in the Argentine First Division, while Belgrano does not get promoted and remains in Argentine Nacional B.

International qualification

Copa Sudamericana
Qualification for the 2008 Copa Sudamericana is determined from an aggregate table of the Apertura and Clausura tournaments. The top four teams in the aggregate table qualify; Boca Juniors and River Plate are invited regardless of their standings in the season, this season Arsenal was also invited as defending champions.

Aggregate table

Managerial Changes
This is a list of the managerial changes in the Argentine Primera during the 2007-2008 season.

Transfers
See List of Argentine Primera División transfers (2007–08 season).

See also

 2007–08 in Argentine football

References

1
Argentine Primera División seasons